The Habo Pentecostal Church is a church building in Habo, Sweden. Belonging to the Swedish Pentecostal Movement, the church was inaugurated on 11–12 October 1969 and renovated in 1995.

References

External links

official website 

20th-century Pentecostal church buildings
Churches in Habo Municipality
20th-century churches in Sweden
Habo
Pentecostal churches in Sweden
Churches completed in 1969